Brad Yoder is a songwriter/performer who resides in Pittsburgh. He is well known in the Pittsburgh music scene, and his music has appeared in television shows such as NUMB3RS and Dawson's Creek. He was voted "Best Acoustic Artist" by readers of the Pittsburgh City Paper in 2003, 2004, 2006 and 2007.

Discography
 Excellent Trouble (2010)
 Someday or Never (2007)
 Used (2002)
 Talk to Total Strangers (1999)
 Best Sunday Heart (1997)

Notes

External links
 Brad Yoder's home page
 Brad Yoder biography  - billboard.com
 Brad Yoder biography - vh1.com
 Brad Yoder's new 'Excellent Trouble' worth the wait - Pittsburgh Post-Gazette
 Interview with Singer and Songwriter, Brad Yoder

Living people
Songwriters from Pennsylvania
Musicians from Pittsburgh
Year of birth missing (living people)